Stade Olympique de Béja, known as Stade Boujemaa Kmiti is a multi-use stadium in Béja, Tunisia.  It is currently used by football team Olympique Béja.  The stadium holds 15,000 people.

It takes its name from the former Olympique Béja player, Boujemaa Kmiti.

Beja